Tania Pauline Dawson (born 2 January 1993) is a New Zealand actress, singer, teacher, model and beauty pageant titleholder who won Miss New Zealand 2016. She represented New Zealand at Miss Universe 2016.

Personal life
Dawson was born and raised in Waiuku. Her mother is a Filipino from Santa Maria, Pangasinan. Dawson completed a Bachelor of Arts double major in drama and film/television and media studies from the University of Auckland, where she also received a graduate diploma in secondary teaching.

She is currently working as a media studies and drama teacher at Southern Cross Campus.

Acting career
Dawson worked with many stars such as Murray Edmond, Maya Dalziel, Sally Stockwell and Mike Edwards. she usually play in Short Films.

Pageantry

Miss New Zealand 2016
On 3 September 2016, during the final night, Dawson was crowned Miss New Zealand 2016 and competed at Miss Universe 2016 in the Philippines.

Miss Universe 2016
Dawson represented New Zealand at Miss Universe 2016 but Unplaced.

References

External links
 Official website

1993 births
Living people
Miss Universe 2016 contestants
New Zealand beauty pageant winners
New Zealand female models
New Zealand people of Filipino descent
People from Waiuku
University of Auckland alumni